The Norwegian Minister of Defence is the head of the Norwegian Ministry of Defence. The position has existed since 1814. The incumbent minister since 12 April 2022 is Bjørn Arild Gram of the Centre Party. 

Between 1819 and 1885 the Ministry was split into two different ministries, the Ministry of the Navy and the Army Ministry.

List of Norwegian Ministers of Defence (1814–1885)

Ministers of Defence (1885–present)

Key

Ministers

References

Ministry of Defence. Councillor of State 1814-present - Government.no
 Norwegian Ministry of the Navy and Postal Affairs - Government.no

Defence
1814 establishments in Norway
Norway